Epichlorohydrin (abbreviated ECH) is an organochlorine compound and an epoxide. Despite its name, it is not a halohydrin. It is a colorless liquid with a pungent, garlic-like odor, moderately soluble in water, but miscible with most polar organic solvents. It is a chiral molecule generally existing as a racemic mixture of right-handed and left-handed enantiomers. Epichlorohydrin is a highly reactive electrophilic compound and is used in the production of glycerol, plastics, epoxy glues and resins, epoxy diluents and elastomers.

Production
Epichlorohydrin is traditionally manufactured from allyl chloride in two steps, beginning with the addition of hypochlorous acid, which affords a mixture of two isomeric alcohols:

In the second step, this mixture is treated with base to give the epoxide:

In this way, more than 800,000 tons (1997) of epichlorohydrin are produced annually.

Glycerol routes
Epichlorohydrin was first described in 1848 by Marcellin Berthelot. The compound was isolated during studies on reactions between glycerol and gaseous hydrogen chloride.

Reminiscent of Berthelot's experiment, glycerol-to-epichlorohydrin (GTE) plants have been commercialized.  This technology capitalizes on the availability of cheap glycerol from  biofuels processing. In the process developed by Dow Chemical, glycerol undergoes two substitution reactions when treated with hydrogen chloride in the presence of a carboxylic acid catalyst. This is the same intermediate formed in the allyl chloride/hypochlorous acid process, and is likewise then treated with base to form epichlorohydrin.

Other routes
Routes that involve fewer chlorinated intermediates have continued to attract interest.  One such process entails epoxidation of allyl chloride.

Applications

Glycerol and epoxy resins synthesis
Epichlorohydrin is mainly converted to bisphenol A diglycidyl ether, a building block in the manufacture of epoxy resins. It is also a precursor to monomers for other resins and polymers. Another usage is the conversion to synthetic glycerol. However, the rapid increase in biodiesel production, where glycerol is a waste product, has led to a glut of glycerol on the market, rendering this process uneconomical. Synthetic glycerol is now used only in sensitive pharmaceutical, and biotech applications where quality standards are very high.

Minor and niche applications
Epichlorohydrin is a versatile precursor in the synthesis of many organic compounds.  For example, it is converted to glycidyl nitrate, an energetic binder used in explosive and propellant compositions. The epichlorohydrin is reacted with an alkali nitrate, such as sodium nitrate, producing glycidyl nitrate and alkali chloride.  It is used as a solvent for cellulose, resins, and paints, and it has found use as an insect fumigant.

Polymers made from epichlorohydrin, e.g., polyamide-epichlorohydrin resins, are used in paper reinforcement and in the food industry to manufacture tea bags, coffee filters, and sausage/salami casings as well as with water purification.

An important biochemical application of epichlorohydrin is its use as crosslinking agent for the production of Sephadex size-exclusion chromatographic resins from dextrans.

Safety
Epichlorohydrin is classified by several international health research agencies and groups as a probable or likely carcinogen in humans. Prolonged oral consumption of high levels of epichlorohydrin could result in stomach problems and an increased risk of cancer. Occupational exposure to epichlorohydrin via inhalation could result in lung irritation and an increased risk of lung cancer.

References

Organochlorides
Solvents
IARC Group 2A carcinogens
Epoxides
Male reproductive toxicants
Commodity chemicals